Maria Helena Cunha (born 19 December 1943) is a Portuguese gymnast. She competed in five events at the 1960 Summer Olympics.

References

External links
 

1943 births
Living people
Portuguese female artistic gymnasts
Olympic gymnasts of Portugal
Gymnasts at the 1960 Summer Olympics
People from Paredes, Portugal
Sportspeople from Porto District